The 3rd constituency of the Bas-Rhin is a French legislative constituency in the Bas-Rhin département.

Description

Bas-Rhin's 3rd Constituency includes the northern suburbs of the city of Strasbourg. Control of the cantons that make up the constituency was split between UMP and PS through to the early 2010s, a fact reflected in the close margin of victory for André Schneider at the 2012 election.  In 2017, the PS vote collapsed here as elsewhere, with their candidate coming 4th in the first round with only 6.4% of the vote.

Historic representation

Election results

2022 

 
 
|-
| colspan="8" bgcolor="#E9E9E9"|
|-

2017 

|- style="background-color:#E9E9E9;text-align:center;"
! colspan="2" rowspan="2" style="text-align:left;" | Candidate
! rowspan="2" colspan="2" style="text-align:left;" | Party
! colspan="2" | 1st round
! colspan="2" | 2nd round
|- style="background-color:#E9E9E9;text-align:center;"
! width="75" | Votes
! width="30" | %
! width="75" | Votes
! width="30" | %
|-
| style="background-color:" |
| style="text-align:left;" | Bruno Studer
| style="text-align:left;" | La République En Marche!
| LREM
| 
| 39.50
| 
| 59.77
|-
| style="background-color:" |
| style="text-align:left;" | Georges Schuler
| style="text-align:left;" | The Republicans
| LR
| 
| 16.60
| 
| 40.23
|-
| style="background-color:" |
| style="text-align:left;" | Floriane Dupré
| style="text-align:left;" | La France Insoumise
| FI
| 
| 11.59
| colspan="2" style="text-align:left;" |
|-
| style="background-color:" |
| style="text-align:left;" | Diana Garnier-Lang
| style="text-align:left;" | National Front
| FN
| 
| 8.95
| colspan="2" style="text-align:left;" |
|-
| style="background-color:" |
| style="text-align:left;" | Serge Oehler
| style="text-align:left;" | Socialist Party
| PS
| 
| 6.41
| colspan="2" style="text-align:left;" |
|-
| style="background-color:" |
| style="text-align:left;" | Christelle Syllas
| style="text-align:left;" | Ecologist
| ECO
| 
| 5.88
| colspan="2" style="text-align:left;" |
|-
| style="background-color:" |
| style="text-align:left;" | Andrée Munchenbach
| style="text-align:left;" | Regionalist
| REG
| 
| 4.71
| colspan="2" style="text-align:left;" |
|-
| style="background-color:" |
| style="text-align:left;" | Julie Roesch
| style="text-align:left;" | Independent
| DIV
| 
| 1.39
| colspan="2" style="text-align:left;" |
|-
| style="background-color:" |
| style="text-align:left;" | Salih Caglar
| style="text-align:left;" | Independent
| DIV
| 
| 1.19
| colspan="2" style="text-align:left;" |
|-
| style="background-color:" |
| style="text-align:left;" | Antoine Splet
| style="text-align:left;" | Communist Party
| PCF
| 
| 1.03
| colspan="2" style="text-align:left;" |
|-
| style="background-color:" |
| style="text-align:left;" | Lucienne Anthiaume
| style="text-align:left;" | Debout la France
| DLF
| 
| 0.90
| colspan="2" style="text-align:left;" |
|-
| style="background-color:" |
| style="text-align:left;" | Sylvie Marinet
| style="text-align:left;" | Independent
| DIV
| 
| 0.69
| colspan="2" style="text-align:left;" |
|-
| style="background-color:" |
| style="text-align:left;" | Xavier Codderens
| style="text-align:left;" | Far Right
| EXD
| 
| 0.56
| colspan="2" style="text-align:left;" |
|-
| style="background-color:" |
| style="text-align:left;" | Marie-Claire Lechene
| style="text-align:left;" | Far Left
| EXG
| 
| 0.51
| colspan="2" style="text-align:left;" |
|-
| style="background-color:" |
| style="text-align:left;" | Yves Laybourn
| style="text-align:left;" | Independent
| DIV
| 
| 0.08
| colspan="2" style="text-align:left;" |
|-
| colspan="8" style="background-color:#E9E9E9;"|
|- style="font-weight:bold"
| colspan="4" style="text-align:left;" | Total
| 
| 100%
| 
| 100%
|-
| colspan="8" style="background-color:#E9E9E9;"|
|-
| colspan="4" style="text-align:left;" | Registered voters
| 
| style="background-color:#E9E9E9;"|
| 
| style="background-color:#E9E9E9;"|
|-
| colspan="4" style="text-align:left;" | Blank/Void ballots
| 
| 1.20%
| 
| 9.22%
|-
| colspan="4" style="text-align:left;" | Turnout
| 
| 46.25%
| 
| 38.35%
|-
| colspan="4" style="text-align:left;" | Abstentions
| 
| 53.75%
| 
| 61.65%
|-
| colspan="8" style="background-color:#E9E9E9;"|
|- style="font-weight:bold"
| colspan="6" style="text-align:left;" | Result
| colspan="2" style="background-color:" | LREM GAIN FROM UMP
|}

2012 

|- style="background-color:#E9E9E9;text-align:center;"
! colspan="2" rowspan="2" style="text-align:left;" | Candidate
! rowspan="2" colspan="2" style="text-align:left;" | Party
! colspan="2" | 1st round
! colspan="2" | 2nd round
|- style="background-color:#E9E9E9;text-align:center;"
! width="75" | Votes
! width="30" | %
! width="75" | Votes
! width="30" | %
|-
| style="background-color:" |
| style="text-align:left;" | André Schneider
| style="text-align:left;" | Union for a Popular Movement
| UMP
| 
| 38.04
| 
| 50.99
|-
| style="background-color:" |
| style="text-align:left;" | Andrée Buchmann
| style="text-align:left;" | Europe Ecology - The Greens
| EELV
| 
| 36.71
| 
| 49.01
|-
| style="background-color:" |
| style="text-align:left;" | Huguette Fatna
| style="text-align:left;" | National Front
| FN
| 
| 13.17
| colspan="2" style="text-align:left;" |
|-
| style="background-color:" |
| style="text-align:left;" | Marc Baader
| style="text-align:left;" | Left Front
| FG
| 
| 5.28
| colspan="2" style="text-align:left;" |
|-
| style="background-color:" |
| style="text-align:left;" | Mathilde Karceles
| style="text-align:left;" | The Centre for France
| CEN
| 
| 3.82
| colspan="2" style="text-align:left;" |
|-
| style="background-color:" |
| style="text-align:left;" | Matthieu Wiedenhoff
| style="text-align:left;" | Other
| AUT
| 
| 1.30
| colspan="2" style="text-align:left;" |
|-
| style="background-color:" |
| style="text-align:left;" | Jean-Paul Leonhardt
| style="text-align:left;" | Miscellaneous Right
| DVD
| 
| 0.92
| colspan="2" style="text-align:left;" |
|-
| style="background-color:" |
| style="text-align:left;" | Marie-Claire Lechene
| style="text-align:left;" | Far Left
| EXG
| 
| 0.75
| colspan="2" style="text-align:left;" |
|-
| colspan="8" style="background-color:#E9E9E9;"|
|- style="font-weight:bold"
| colspan="4" style="text-align:left;" | Total
| 
| 100%
| 
| 100%
|-
| colspan="8" style="background-color:#E9E9E9;"|
|-
| colspan="4" style="text-align:left;" | Registered voters
| 
| style="background-color:#E9E9E9;"|
| 
| style="background-color:#E9E9E9;"|
|-
| colspan="4" style="text-align:left;" | Blank/Void ballots
| 
| 1.13%
| 
| 2.40%
|-
| colspan="4" style="text-align:left;" | Turnout
| 
| 52.19%
| 
| 50.90%
|-
| colspan="4" style="text-align:left;" | Abstentions
| 
| 47.81%
| 
| 49.10%
|-
| colspan="8" style="background-color:#E9E9E9;"|
|- style="font-weight:bold"
| colspan="6" style="text-align:left;" | Result
| colspan="2" style="background-color:" | UMP HOLD
|}

2007

|- style="background-color:#E9E9E9;text-align:center;"
! colspan="2" rowspan="2" style="text-align:left;" | Candidate
! rowspan="2" colspan="2" style="text-align:left;" | Party
! colspan="2" | 1st round
! colspan="2" | 2nd round
|- style="background-color:#E9E9E9;text-align:center;"
! width="75" | Votes
! width="30" | %
! width="75" | Votes
! width="30" | %
|-
| style="background-color:" |
| style="text-align:left;" | André Schneider
| style="text-align:left;" | Union for a Popular Movement
| UMP
| 
| 47.18
| 
| 57.75
|-
| style="background-color:" |
| style="text-align:left;" | Zoubida Naïli
| style="text-align:left;" | Socialist Party
| PS
| 
| 20.83
| 
| 42.25
|-
| style="background-color:" |
| style="text-align:left;" | Bornia Tarall
| style="text-align:left;" | UDF-Democratic Movement
| UDF-MoDem
| 
| 10.27
| colspan="2" style="text-align:left;" |
|-
| style="background-color:" |
| style="text-align:left;" | Andrée Buchmann
| style="text-align:left;" | The Greens
| LV
| 
| 5.61
| colspan="2" style="text-align:left;" |
|-
| style="background-color:" |
| style="text-align:left;" | Natacha Lugonja
| style="text-align:left;" | National Front
| FN
| 
| 5.36
| colspan="2" style="text-align:left;" |
|-
| style="background-color:" |
| style="text-align:left;" | Mohamed Latreche
| style="text-align:left;" | Independent
| DIV
| 
| 2.30
| colspan="2" style="text-align:left;" |
|-
| style="background-color:" |
| style="text-align:left;" | Jean-Luc Muller
| style="text-align:left;" | Far Left
| EXG
| 
| 2.09
| colspan="2" style="text-align:left;" |
|-
| style="background-color:" |
| style="text-align:left;" | Jacques Werchmann
| style="text-align:left;" | Ecologist
| ECO
| 
| 1.40
| colspan="2" style="text-align:left;" |
|-
| style="background-color:" |
| style="text-align:left;" | Claude Weber
| style="text-align:left;" | Independent
| DIV
| 
| 1.38
| colspan="2" style="text-align:left;" |
|-
| style="background-color:" |
| style="text-align:left;" | Marie-Claire Lechêne
| style="text-align:left;" | Far Left
| EXG
| 
| 0.95
| colspan="2" style="text-align:left;" |
|-
| style="background-color:" |
| style="text-align:left;" | Julien Gorrand
| style="text-align:left;" | Communist Party
| PCF
| 
| 0.93
| colspan="2" style="text-align:left;" |
|-
| style="background-color:" |
| style="text-align:left;" | Dominique Jobredeaux
| style="text-align:left;" | Independent
| DIV
| 
| 0.74
| colspan="2" style="text-align:left;" |
|-
| style="background-color:" |
| style="text-align:left;" | David Jacquart
| style="text-align:left;" | Far Right
| EXD
| 
| 0.63
| colspan="2" style="text-align:left;" |
|-
| style="background-color:" |
| style="text-align:left;" | Yasmina Benchohra-Sadarnac
| style="text-align:left;" | Independent
| DIV
| 
| 0.33
| colspan="2" style="text-align:left;" |
|-

| colspan="8" style="background-color:#E9E9E9;"|
|- style="font-weight:bold"
| colspan="4" style="text-align:left;" | Total
| 
| 100%
| 
| 100%
|-
| colspan="8" style="background-color:#E9E9E9;"|
|-
| colspan="4" style="text-align:left;" | Registered voters
| 
| style="background-color:#E9E9E9;"|
| 
| style="background-color:#E9E9E9;"|
|-
| colspan="4" style="text-align:left;" | Blank/Void ballots
| 
| 1.21%
| 
| 2.38%
|-
| colspan="4" style="text-align:left;" | Turnout
| 
| 51.81%
| 
| 48.15%
|-
| colspan="4" style="text-align:left;" | Abstentions
| 
| 48.19%
| 
| 51.85%
|-
| colspan="8" style="background-color:#E9E9E9;"|
|- style="font-weight:bold"
| colspan="6" style="text-align:left;" | Result
| colspan="2" style="background-color:" | UMP HOLD
|}

2002 

|- style="background-color:#E9E9E9;text-align:center;"
! colspan="2" rowspan="2" style="text-align:left;" | Candidate
! rowspan="2" colspan="2" style="text-align:left;" | Party
! colspan="2" | 1st round
! colspan="2" | 2nd round
|- style="background-color:#E9E9E9;text-align:center;"
! width="75" | Votes
! width="30" | %
! width="75" | Votes
! width="30" | %
|-
| style="background-color:" |
| style="text-align:left;" | Andre Schneider
| style="text-align:left;" | Union for a Presidential Majority
| UMP
| 
| 36.75
| 
| 58.33
|-
| style="background-color:" |
| style="text-align:left;" | Catherine Trautmann
| style="text-align:left;" | Socialist Party
| PS
| 
| 31.97
| 
| 41.67
|-
| style="background-color:" |
| style="text-align:left;" | Xavier Codderens
| style="text-align:left;" | National Front
| FN
| 
| 11.30
| colspan="2" style="text-align:left;" |
|-
| style="background-color:" |
| style="text-align:left;" | Bertrand Hirtz
| style="text-align:left;" | Union for French Democracy
| UDF
| 
| 6.28
| colspan="2" style="text-align:left;" |
|-
| style="background-color:" |
| style="text-align:left;" | Stephane Bourhis
| style="text-align:left;" | National Republican Movement
| MNR
| 
| 3.68
| colspan="2" style="text-align:left;" |
|-
| style="background-color:" |
| style="text-align:left;" | J. Marie Kutner
| style="text-align:left;" | Miscellaneous Left
| DVG
| 
| 3.03
| colspan="2" style="text-align:left;" |
|-
| style="background-color:" |
| style="text-align:left;" | Andree Munchenbach
| style="text-align:left;" | Ecologist
| ECO
| 
| 2.82
| colspan="2" style="text-align:left;" |
|-
| style="background-color:" |
| style="text-align:left;" | J. Claude Meyer
| style="text-align:left;" | Revolutionary Communist League
| LCR
| 
| 0.92
| colspan="2" style="text-align:left;" |
|-
| style="background-color:" |
| style="text-align:left;" | M. Claire Lechene
| style="text-align:left;" | Workers’ Struggle
| LO
| 
| 0.90
| colspan="2" style="text-align:left;" |
|-
| style="background-color:" |
| style="text-align:left;" | Claude Leclerc
| style="text-align:left;" | Communist Party
| PCF
| 
| 0.82
| colspan="2" style="text-align:left;" |
|-
| style="background-color:" |
| style="text-align:left;" | Nicole Plancon
| style="text-align:left;" | Independent
| DIV
| 
| 0.54
| colspan="2" style="text-align:left;" |
|-
| style="background-color:" |
| style="text-align:left;" | Yasmina Benchohra-Sadarnac
| style="text-align:left;" | Miscellaneous Right
| DVD
| 
| 0.43
| colspan="2" style="text-align:left;" |
|-
| style="background-color:" |
| style="text-align:left;" | Olivier Valet
| style="text-align:left;" | Independent
| DIV
| 
| 0.35
| colspan="2" style="text-align:left;" |
|-
| style="background-color:" |
| style="text-align:left;" | Evelyne Gonthier
| style="text-align:left;" | Independent
| DIV
| 
| 0.21
| colspan="2" style="text-align:left;" |
|-
| style="background-color:" |
| style="text-align:left;" | C. Andre Welschinger
| style="text-align:left;" | Independent
| DIV
| 
| 0.00
| colspan="2" style="text-align:left;" |
|-
| colspan="8" style="background-color:#E9E9E9;"|
|- style="font-weight:bold"
| colspan="4" style="text-align:left;" | Total
| 
| 100%
| 
| 100%
|-
| colspan="8" style="background-color:#E9E9E9;"|
|-
| colspan="4" style="text-align:left;" | Registered voters
| 
| style="background-color:#E9E9E9;"|
| 
| style="background-color:#E9E9E9;"|
|-
| colspan="4" style="text-align:left;" | Blank/Void ballots
| 
| 1.21%
| 
| 2.47%
|-
| colspan="4" style="text-align:left;" | Turnout
| 
| 59.10%
| 
| 54.91%
|-
| colspan="4" style="text-align:left;" | Abstentions
| 
| 40.90%
| 
| 45.09%
|-
| colspan="8" style="background-color:#E9E9E9;"|
|- style="font-weight:bold"
| colspan="6" style="text-align:left;" | Result
| colspan="2" style="background-color:" | UMP HOLD
|}

2012

Sources

Official results of French elections from 2002: "Résultats électoraux officiels en France" (in French).

3